Alpen is a line of muesli varieties manufactured by the Weetabix cereal company of Kettering, Northamptonshire, England.

History
Weetabix cereals in the UK created Alpen muesli cereal in 1971. Alpen is a whole grain muesli cereal consisting of rolled oats, fruits and nuts.

In the UK, Alpen has been a staple on British shelves since the 1970s, accounting for 3% of the UK and Ireland breakfast cereal sales in 2003. It appeared in the early 1970s in Canada and then in the US in the 1990s after Weetabix established a partnership with natural foods manufacturer, Barbara's Bakery.

In North America, Alpen No Added Sugar and Alpen Original are mainstays in U.S. natural food stores and Canadian grocery stores. In the UK, Weetabix sells Alpen in four varieties. Alpen is exported to other countries in several varieties.

Related cereals and products

In the UK, Alpen has created several varieties, including:
Alpen Original
Alpen Original (No Added Sugar)
Alpen High Fruit
Alpen High Fibre

In both the U.S.and Canada, Alpen varieties are:

Alpen Original
Alpen No Added Sugar
New Alpen Apple Spice was introduced in Canada in 2010, featuring three whole grains, apples, toasted soy nuggets and flax seed, with 500 mg of Omega ALA.

As of December 2009, the U.S. Alpens were reformulated to an all-natural formula, discontinuing the use of added vitamins, minerals and organic grains.

In the past, several non-muesli Alpen cereals debuted under the Alpen brand. While most of these cereals have undergone changes in name only, here is a list of cereals which at one point were in the Alpen division of Weetabix, along with date of name change.

Alpen Wheat Flakes (formerly Advantage cereal) — 2004
Alpen Crunchy Bran (formerly Crunchy Bran cereal) — 2004

As a brand extension and a reaction to consumer appetite for whole grain snacks, Weetabix introduced Alpen whole grain cereal bars, which include varieties of several fruit flavours. As of February 2012, these include:

Strawberry & Yogurt (red)
Raspberry & Yoghurt (pink)
Fruit & Nut (green)
Fruit & Nut with Chocolate (brown)
Coconut with Chocolate (blue)
Apricot & Yoghurt (new for 2012)
Summer Fruit (light variant)
Chocolate & Fudge (light variant)
Chocolate & Orange (light variant)
Apple & Sultana (light variant)
Double Chocolate (light variant)
Cherry Bakewell (light variant – new for 2012)

Sugar and whey content
Three varieties of UK Alpen include sugar; there is one No Added Sugar variety, also available in the U.S. and Canada. Alpen also contains whey.

See also
Breakfast cereal
List of breakfast cereals
Muesli

Footnotes

External links
 Alpen

Almond dishes
Weetabix cereals
Food brands of the United Kingdom